Bayly is a surname. Notable people with the surname include:

Charles Bayly (fl. c. 1630–1680), the first overseas governor of the Hudson's Bay Company
Christopher Alan Bayly (C.A. Bayly) (1945-2015), British historian specialising in British Imperial, Indian and global history
Jaime Bayly (born 1965), Peruvian journalist and writer
Joseph T. Bayly (1920-1986), American author and publishing executive
Lewis Bayly (died 1631), an English author and Anglican bishop
Sir Lewis Bayly (1857-1938), a British admiral
Lorraine Bayly (born 1937), Australian actress
Maurice Beddow Bayly (died 1962), English physician, anti-vivisection activist, and anti-vaccination campaigner
Robert Bayly (born 1988), Irish footballer
Thomas Bayly (Maryland politician) (1775-1829), Maryland congressman
Thomas H. Bayly (1810-1856), Virginia congressman
Thomas Haynes Bayly (1797-1839), English poet, songwriter and dramatist
Thomas M. Bayly (1775-1834), Virginia congressman
 William Bayly (astronomer) (1737–1810), English astronomer
 William Bayly (barrister) (1540–1612), English barrister and politician
 William Alfred Bayly (1906–1934), New Zealand farmer and convicted murderer
 W. R. Bayly (1867–1937), educator in South Australia

Zachary Bayly (military officer) (1841-1916), South African colonial military commander

See also
The Bayly Baronets, a number of persons with the surname Bayly who held a baronetcy
Bailey (surname)
Bayley (disambiguation)
Baillie (surname)
Bailie (name)